Lucas Oliveira may refer to:

 Lucas Oliveira (footballer, born 1995), Brazilian football forward
 Lucas Oliveira (footballer, born 1996), Brazilian football centre-back

See also
 Lucas Evangelista (born 1995), full name Lucas Evangelista Santana de Oliveira, Brazilian football midfielder
 Lucas Marques (footballer, born 1995), full name Lucas Marques de Oliveira, Brazilian football defensive midfielder